Phoenix is an unincorporated community in Keweenaw County, Michigan, United States. Phoenix lies at the junction of M-26 and US 41, approximately two miles south of Eagle River, Michigan, near the shores of Lake Superior.

Copper
Phoenix was the site of the Phoenix Mine, one of the earliest copper mines in the Keweenaw Peninsula. The Phoenix Copper Mining Company's predecessor, the Lake Superior Copper Company, was the first active copper mine in the Copper Country, established in the early 1840s.

Phoenix today

Few buildings remain. The Phoenix Store is the only functioning business in Phoenix, selling pop, beer, snacks, candy, toiletries and historical books about the area. There are two bars about a mile southwest of Phoenix along US-41. The Bammert Blacksmith Shop and the Church of the Assumption are two buildings dating back to the 1800s and are run by the Keweenaw County Historical Society.

References

Unincorporated communities in Keweenaw County, Michigan
Unincorporated communities in Michigan
Populated places established in 1842
1842 establishments in Michigan